Éric Demarsan (born 2 October 1938), also known as Éric de Marsanis, is a French film score composer.

Life and career

After working as arranger for composers Michel Magne then François de Roubaix (including on Le Samouraï) he scored L'Armée des ombres (aka Army of Shadows) in 1969 then Le Cercle rouge (aka The red circle) in 1970, both by director Jean-Pierre Melville.

After that, he scored numerous movies for other great directors like Jean-Pierre Mocky, Costa-Gavras or Patrice Leconte.

Éric Demarsan also composed many songs, the Pop Symphony album under pseudonym Jason Havelock, as well as some musics for sound and light shows.

Since 2000 he works frequently with director Guillaume Nicloux and then Hervé Hadmar.

Selected filmography

 1968 : Sébastien parmi les hommes (TV), by Cécile Aubry
 1969 : L'Armée des ombres, by Jean-Pierre Melville
 1970 : Le Cercle rouge, by Jean-Pierre Melville
 1971 : L'Humeur vagabonde, by Édouard Luntz
 1974 : Section spéciale, by Costa-Gavras
 1975 : La Rage au poing, by Eric Le Hung
 1978 : Attention, Les Enfants Regardent, by Serge Leroy
 1982 : , by Pierre Lary
 1983 : Un bon petit diable, by Jean-Claude Brialy
 1983 : Le bourreau des cœurs, by Christian Gion
 1983 : Debout les crabes, la mer monte !, de Jean-Jacques Grand-Jouan
 1985 : Les Spécialistes, by Patrice Leconte
 1985 : Moi vouloir toi, by Patrick Dewolf
 1988 : Juillet en septembre, by Sébastien Japrisot
 1998 : Vidange, by Jean-Pierre Mocky
 1993 : La Treizième voiture, by Alain Bonnot
 2000 : La Candide madame Duff, by Jean-Pierre Mocky
 2001 : La Bête de miséricorde, by Jean-Pierre Mocky
 2002 : A Private Affair, by Guillaume Nicloux
 2003 : That Woman, by Guillaume Nicloux
 2006 : Le Concile de Pierre, by Guillaume Nicloux
 2007 : Les Oubliées (TV), by Hervé Hadmar
 2009 : Pigalle, la nuit (TV), by Hervé Hadmar
 2010 : Signature (TV), by Hervé Hadmar
 2012 : L'affaire Gordji (TV), by Guillaume Nicloux
 2016 : The End, by Guillaume Nicloux

References
Autobiography at www.demarsan.com
Interviews at edemarsan.free.fr
 Universal CD booklets by Stéphane Lerouge and Éric Demarsan

External links
  (in French only)
 non official website 
 
 Éric Demarsan fan site (in both French and English)

1938 births
French film score composers
French male film score composers
Living people
Musicians from Paris